Niva is a rural locality (a village) in Kichmegnskoye Rural Settlement, Kichmengsko-Gorodetsky District, Vologda Oblast, Russia. The population was 15 as of 2002.

Geography 
Niva is located 13 km southeast of Kichmengsky Gorodok (the district's administrative centre) by road. Chupovo is the nearest rural locality.

References 

Rural localities in Kichmengsko-Gorodetsky District